Bobieding is a small Aboriginal community, located  north of Broome in the Kimberley region of Western Australia, within the Shire of Broome.

History

The Bobieding Community is named after a local fresh spring water hole called Bobbies Spring. Bobieding consists of members of an extended family and was founded by Phillip Cox, community elder.

Native title 

The community is located within the registered area of the Bindunbur (WAD359/2013) native title.

Governance 

The community is managed through its incorporated body, Bobieding Aboriginal Corporation, incorporated under the Aboriginal Councils and Associations Act 1976 on 26 August 1988.

Town planning 

Bobieding Layout Plan No.1 has been prepared in accordance with State Planning Strategy 3.2 Aboriginal Settlements. Layout Plan No.1 was endorsed by the community on 1 August 2003, and by the Western Australian Planning Commission on 24 February 2004.

The Layout Plan map-set and background report can be viewed at Planning Western Australia's official site.

References

External links 
 Planning Western Australia's official site – Bobieding Layout Plan (https://www.dplh.wa.gov.au/information-and-services/state-planning/aboriginal-communities/aboriginal-community-maps/layout-plans)

Towns in Western Australia
Aboriginal communities in Kimberley (Western Australia)